A Gracious Neighbor is a 2022 novel by Chris Cander.

It is derived from the 1917 short story "A Jury of Her Peers," written by Susan Glaspell. Cander, who moved to West University Place, Texas in 2005, reworked the story by moving it into a setting that she "was comfortable with."

The novel is set in West University Place and uses crape myrtles as a symbol for what Cander calls "oppositional opinions".

Publishers Weekly praised the work, including the satire used, its "keen sense of place, and a feminist sensibility."

See also
 The Weight of a Piano - A 2019 novel by Cander

References

External links
 A Gracious Neighbor - Chris Cander official website
  - Cander discusses the work in a portion of the recording. Recording file

2022 American novels
Novels set in Texas